Derriford Hospital is a large teaching hospital in Plymouth, England. The hospital serves Plymouth and nearby areas of Devon and Cornwall. It also provides tertiary cardiothoracic surgery, neurosurgery and renal transplant surgery for the whole of the South West Peninsula. It is managed by the University Hospitals Plymouth NHS Trust. It was designated a major trauma centre in 2013. A helipad capable of night operation was opened in 2015, to replace the existing daytime-only grass pad. The hospital is used for clinical training of medical students from the Plymouth University Peninsula School of Medicine. It is one of five hospitals with attached Ministry of Defence Hospital Units to cater to service personnel.

History
In 1950, there was a proposal for a single hospital for the Plymouth area. The regional hospital board decided that this would be built at Derriford, at the cost of £2million. The planned hospital was expected to have around 900 beds, and would be built service by service as the other hospitals around Plymouth are closed. After all services transferred from Plymouth General Hospital and renal services started transferring from the Freedom Fields Hospital, Derriford Hospital officially opened in 1981 and became the primary hospital in Plymouth. When it opened, two wards were allocated to create a school for hospitalised children. The school continued to provide education for 30 years until it was replaced by the newly opened Plymouth Hospital and Outreach School in 2011.
 
In August 2011, a purpose built dialysis unit was added to the hospital. In 2012, the Peninsula Trauma Centre opened, designated nationally as a major trauma centre, receiving 400 patients by air ambulance each year. In 2015, a new helipad was built at a cost of £1.7M. The helipad is large enough to accept search and rescue helicopters, and was the first in the region to allow night time landings.

In 2022, the helipad was subject of a major incident when a woman was killed by a HM Coastguard Search And Rescue Helicopter. One woman was also seriously injured.

Facilities
Derriford is a teaching hospital, linked to the Peninsula Medical School, and has a Ministry of Defence Hospital Unit integrated into the facility, with military personnel working in medical roles. The hospital includes specialist services, including pancreatic cancer surgery, plastic surgery and neonatal intensive care.  In 2016, more than 48,000 people used the hospital each week, accessing 900 beds and 1,000 car parking spaces. The bus terminal at the hospital is the second largest in Plymouth.

See also
 Healthcare in Cornwall
 Healthcare in Devon
 List of hospitals in England

References

External links

Hospital buildings completed in 1981
NHS hospitals in England
Teaching hospitals in England
Hospitals in Devon
Buildings and structures in Plymouth, Devon
Hospitals established in 1981
Brutalist architecture in England